Battle of Kerch can refer to:
 Battle of Kerch Strait (1774)
 Battle of Kerch Strait (1790)
 Battle of the Kerch Peninsula (1941-1942)